Lakelands railway station is an under-construction railway station along the Mandurah line on the Transperth network in Western Australia. Construction started in 2021 and it is planned to open in mid-2023.

Provisions for the station were made when the Mandurah line was originally built during the 2000s. There were several proposals to build the station during the 2010s, but when the state Labor Party came to power in 2017, it had committed to build the nearby Karnup station but not Lakelands station. Meanwhile, the federal Liberal Party wanted to build Lakelands station, so it committed to funding 80% of the $80 million required to build the station. The federal government refused requests for the funding to be transferred to the Karnup station project, therefore that project was put on hold so that the state could fund Lakelands station. This resulted in accusations that the federal government was pork barrelling as Lakelands station was in Liberal MP Andrew Hastie's seat whereas Karnup station was in a safe Labor seat held by Madeleine King.

In January 2021, ADCO Constructions was awarded the contract for the design and construction of Lakelands station. The design was released in May 2021 and after a few revisions, was approved. Early works began in August 2021 and major works began in late 2021. The station is planned to open mid-2023. It is planned to have a 10 minute frequency during peak, a 15 minute frequency outside peak and on weekends and public holidays, and a 30 to 60 minute frequency at night. There will be five bus routes and a 400-bay car park.

Description
Lakelands station is located within the northern Mandurah suburb of Lakelands in the state of Western Australia. It will primarily serve Lakelands and the nearby area of Madora Bay. During the development approval process, the area's urban planning was criticised by Joint Development Assessment Panel member Ian Birch for situating the Lakelands Shopping Centre too far away from the planned station. The adjacent stations are Mandurah station to the south and Warnbro station to the north.

Lakelands station is immediately south of where Lake Valley Drive bridges across the Mandurah line. The station's entrance, where the bus interchange and car park are located, is to the west of the railway. The bus interchange will consist of eight sheltered bus stands and will be accessed from Lake Valley Drive. The car park contains approximately 400 bays and will be accessed via Ashwood Parkway. The train station will consist of two side platforms with lifts and stairs. The station is located on an embankment so that the bus interchange is level with the concourse above the platforms. Lakelands station is designed to be universally accessible. Facilities include toilets, a room for up to 96 bicycles, and a transit officer booth. Transit officers are planned to be present from the afternoon peak until last service. There is future proofing for the addition of fare gates, escalators, more lifts and other facilities once patronage increases.

Lakelands station was built by ADCO Constructions and designed by a consultant team appointed by ADCO. The lead architect was DesignInc. The station was designed to complement the surrounding environment, particularly Black Swan Lake. This includes a "neutral colour palette, sculptural concrete forms, and a distinctive overhanging roof". There will be public art designed by Sioux Tempestt and Noongar artist Seantelle Walsh. The artwork is proposed to be sandblasted into the retaining walls and the building's entrance pathway.

History
During the planning for the Mandurah line in the late-1990s and early-2000s, Lakelands station was listed as one of four possible future stations between Mandurah station and Warnbro station (then known as Waikiki station), alongside stations at Gordon Road, Paganoni Road (now called Karnup station), and Stakehill Road. As such, land was set aside and the line was designed with provisions for future stations at these locations. When the Mandurah line opened in December 2007, the  gap between Mandurah and Warnbro stations was the largest gap between stations on the Transperth network.

Lakelands station was included in the Mandurah North Structure Plan, approved by the City of Mandurah council in June 2006, with plans for transit-oriented development around the site of the future station. It was also considered in the 2016 Lakelands West Outline Development Plan, which planned for slightly higher density housing in the blocks surrounding the planned station. Despite the station having been planned since before the residential development of the area, four residential lots were created between the proposed car park and Lake Valley Drive, constraining the site and making noise and privacy issues more difficult to solve.

Opposition Leader Mark McGowan said that if elected, he would build Karnup station irrespective of any potential federal funding. After winning the 2017 state election, Transport Minister Rita Saffioti reconfirmed Labor's commitment to build Karnup station as part of the wider Metronet infrastructure construction project.

Starting in 2017, several public figures, including City of Mandurah Mayor Marina Vergone and Liberal MP Andrew Hastie, whose seat of Canning includes Lakelands but not Karnup, began lobbying for Lakelands station to be built instead of Karnup station. During a visit to Lakelands by Prime Minister Malcolm Turnbull in April 2018, the Federal Government committed $2 million to develop a business case for the station plus more funding for the station's construction subject to the business case. In the 2019 federal budget, $10 million was committed to constructing Lakelands station. By August 2019, that funding had risen to $35 million, but Transport Minister Saffioti said that the total cost would be $75 million and the state government would build Lakelands station if the federal government provided 80% of the funding. She said that 80% funding was standard but Hastie said that 50% was standard and that the station was previously forecast to cost $70 million.

In November 2019, due to a lack of federal funding, the state government put the Karnup station project on hold and committed to building Lakelands station instead. The federal government had by now committed to provide 80% of the funding for the Lakelands station project, which was now projected to cost $80 million. Premier McGowan said the state government still planned on constructing Karnup station and was developing a business case, but the timeframe was unknown. Labor MP Madeleine King, whose seat of Brand encompasses Karnup, said the decision of the federal government to fund only Lakelands station was "based on cynical pork barrelling and political point scoring". Warnbro MLA Paul Papalia described Lakelands earlier in 2019 as the station "nobody wants", but said after the announcement that the state government could not reject $64 million from the federal government and that requests to transfer the funding to Karnup station were declined. City of Rockingham Mayor Barry Sammels was angry that Karnup station had been delayed when the Rockingham council had been told for several years that Karnup station would be built first. Mandurah Mayor Rhys Williams welcomed the announcement.

A "community reference group" (CRG) was set up in 2020 to provide input from the community to the project team. The CRG consists of eight people who are residents or representing local businesses or community groups.

The request for proposal process began in May 2020. ADCO Constructions was selected as the preferred proponent in December 2020 and was awarded the contract for the design and construction of Lakelands station the following month. Concept images were released in May 2021. The design went to the City of Mandurah for approval, which recommended the Western Australian Planning Commission only approve the station if several conditions were met. The conditions included a redesign of the car park, better public transport and pedestrian access, changes to lessen the impact on the environment, and the integration of the bicycle storage area within the station building rather than as a standalone structure. Councillor Ahmed Zilani, who was elected in 2019 after promising to lobby for the construction of Lakelands station, said that a multistorey car park with over 1000 car bays would be needed, rather than the 400 car bays planned. Hastie and Mandurah MLA David Templeman said that the planned 400 bay car park is adequate due to the station being more accessible by foot or by cycling than Mandurah station.

Early works commenced in August 2021. The first things to be done were reconfigurations to the overhead line equipment and earthworks. The Public Transport Authority (PTA) modified the design to fulfil the conditions set by the Mandurah council and the station was approved by a Joint Development Assessment Panel in September 2021, allowing major works to begin in late 2021. During early 2022, works occurred for constructing the platforms, elevator shafts, retaining wall, and earthworks for the car park and bus interchange. In April 2022, the main concourse was lifted into place. By October 2022, the station building was being constructed and by December 2022, the roof was in place. That month, an extra $14 million was added for Lakelands station's operational cost, including for 18 additional staff upon opening, although the construction cost had been reduced to $72 million by that point. The main building works are scheduled to be complete by January or February 2023, with internal works to happen after that. Lakelands station is planned to open in mid-2023.

Services

Rail
Lakelands station will be served by Mandurah line services, operated by Transperth Train Operations, a division of the PTA. The line goes between Mandurah and Perth Underground stations, continuing north from there as the Joondalup line. Mandurah line trains operate through Lakelands at a 10 minute frequency during peak, a 15 minute frequency outside peak and on weekends and public holidays, and a 30 to 60 minute frequency at night. The journey to Perth is expected to take approximately 50 minutes. Lakelands station is projected to receive 2,300 boardings per day upon opening, rising to 3,500 boardings per day by 2031.

Bus
Lakelands station will have a bus interchange with eight bus stands. It is forecast that 25 percent of passengers will arrive at the station via bus in 2031. Bus services in the Rockingham/Mandurah area are operated by Transdev WA under contract. Consultation for bus services for Lakelands station is occurring between 6 and 27 January 2023. A preliminary bus network has been released which has five bus routes serving the station. Route 574 will link to Warnbro station, passing through Madora Bay, Singleton, Golden Bay, Secret Harbour, Port Kennedy before arriving at Warnbro. Routes 584, 585 and 586 will link to Mandurah station, passing through Madora Bay, Meadow Springs, San Remo, Silver Sands and Greenfields. The busiest of these routes, the 574 and 585, will have a 10 minute frequency during peak and 30 minute frequency outside peak. The other routes will have a 20 minute frequency during peak and a 30 or 60 minute frequency outside peak.

References

Further reading

External links
 Lakelands Station on the Metronet website.
 
 

Mandurah line
Proposed railway stations in Perth, Western Australia